The Albert Lea Thunder was a Tier II junior ice hockey team in the North American Hockey League's Central Division. The team was an expansion franchise for the 2008–09 season and played their home games at the Albert Lea Ice Arena in Albert Lea, Minnesota.

History
The franchise joined the North American Hockey League (NAHL) for the 2008–09 season with Chicago businessman Jim Perkins and Barry Soskin as owners. Soskin was also the owner of independent Northern Junior Hockey League teams, the Findlay Grrrowl and defunct Pittsburgh Cougars, as well as the former owner of the ECHL's Toledo Storm and Central Hockey League's Nashville Nighthawks.

On November 18, 2009, it was reported that the Thunder were engaging in "pay-to-play," or taking money to guarantee players' spots on the team, an act that is against the rules under the Tier II sanctioning of USA Hockey for the NAHL. A total of eight players were named and the organization was facing a $400,000 fine from the NAHL. On December 7, 2009, the NAHL's Board of Governors terminated the Albert Lea membership and took over operations of the team during the transition. Despite the scandal, the Thunder mounted a late-season comeback and made the playoffs for the first time in team history in 2010.

In May 2010, the team found new owners and relocated to Amarillo, Texas, for the 2010–11 season as the Amarillo Bulls.

Season records

References

External links
Official site
NAHL website

Defunct North American Hockey League teams
Freeborn County, Minnesota
Amateur ice hockey teams in Minnesota
Ice hockey clubs established in 2008
Sports clubs disestablished in 2010
2008 establishments in Minnesota
2010 disestablishments in Minnesota